This was the first edition of the tournament.

Carolina Alves and María Lourdes Carlé won the title, defeating Valeriya Strakhova and Olivia Tjandramulia in the final, 6–2, 6–1.

Seeds

Draw

Draw

References

External Links
Main Draw

Aberto da República - Doubles